Anthony John Parkes  (born 1950) is a retired Australian Anglican bishop who served as the tenth Bishop of Wangaratta between 13 December 2008 and 21 December 2019.

Parkes began training for ordination in 1986 and was previously an assistant bishop in the Diocese of Brisbane. He also served as rector of All Saints' Church in Ainslie (1998–2004) and was also a former barrister where he served on the General Synod Standing Committee and the Church Law Commission.

Prior to his election, Parkes served as an assistant bishop and the dean of Brisbane in the Diocese of Brisbane.

Parkes was installed as Bishop of Wangaratta on 13 December 2008.

Parkes, as a supporter of same-sex marriage, has been criticised within the church for his stance. In December 2017, Parkes organised Anglican bishops to write to federal members of parliament, seeking that they pass the Marriage Amendment (Definition and Religious Freedoms) Bill 2017, same-sex marriage legislation without stronger religious exemptions.

Parkes retired on 21 December 2019 and was replaced as Bishop of Wangaratta by Clarence Bester.

References

External links

Anglican bishops of Wangaratta
Assistant bishops in the Anglican Diocese of Brisbane
21st-century Anglican bishops in Australia
Living people
Deans of Brisbane
1950 births